Gorzeń Dolny  is a village in the administrative district of Gmina Wadowice, within Wadowice County, Lesser Poland Voivodeship, in southern Poland.

The village has a population of 458.

The village of Gorzeń was first mentioned in 1390 and was differentiated into two parts after the 16th century (since the 19th century known respectively as Gorzeń Dolny and Gorzeń Górny).

References

Villages in Wadowice County